ESL is a common abbreviation for English as a Second Language.

ESL may also refer to:

Languages 
 Egyptian Sign Language
 Estonian Sign Language

Music 
 E.S.L. (band), a Canadian folk pop band
 ESL Music, an American record label

Sport 
 ESL (company), a German company which organizes esports leagues worldwide
 Eastern Soccer League, a defunct American soccer league
 Super League, known as the European Super League and the English Super League, both shortened to ESL
 European Super League, a 2021 proposed European club football competition

Technology 
 Electron-stimulated luminescence
 Electronic shelf label
 Electronic system-level
 Electrostatic loudspeaker
 Equivalent series inductance

Transport 
 Eastleigh railway station, in England
 Elista Airport, in Russia

Other uses 
 ESL Federal Credit Union, an American credit union
 ESL Incorporated, a defunct American technology company
 ESL Investments, an American hedge fund
 ESL Sports Centre, now the Bill Gray's Regional Iceplex, in Rochester, New York
 East Siberian Laika, a breed of dog
East St. Louis, Illinois, United States, a city 
 Eddie Stobart Logistics, a British logistics freight shipping company
 Electrochemical and Solid-State Letters, a defunct scholarly journal
 Environmentally Sensitive Lands, in Florida, United States
 Eslicarbazepine acetate, a drug
 Ethnological Society of London, a defunct learned society
 European School, Luxembourg II, an international school 
 Extended shelf life, in food retail